"I'm So Young" is a song written by William H. "Prez" Tyus, Jr., of Cincinnati, Ohio. First recorded by the Students, the song has received cover versions by Rosie and the Originals, the Del-Vikings,  Benjy Ferree, the Beach Boys, Naomi Wilson, and, as "So Young," by the Ronettes, Antony and the Johnsons, and the Devil Dogs.

While still in high school, Tyus wrote the songs "I'm So Young" and "Every Day of the Week" and gave them to a local African-American vocal group called the D'Italians. Once a recording contract with Checker Records was secured, the group changed its name to the Students, and it was under this name that Tyus's two doo-wop songs were recorded. On May 29, 1961, the Students original of "I'm So Young"  on Argo Records, reached No. 26 on the US Billboard R&B chart.

The Beach Boys version

The Beach Boys recorded the song for their 1965 album The Beach Boys Today!. Its backing track was recorded on January 18, 1965 with vocal overdubs following one day later. An earlier version, recorded on September 9, 1964, was released as a bonus track in a 1990 CD reissue of the album.

Personnel
Sourced from Musician's Union AFM contract sheets and surviving session audio, documented by Craig Slowinski.

The Beach Boys
 Al Jardine – backing and harmony vocals, electric bass guitar
 Mike Love – backing and harmony vocals
 Brian Wilson – lead vocal, 6-string electric bass guitar, Hammond B3 organ, production, mixing
 Carl Wilson – backing and harmony vocals, electric rhythm/lead guitar (intro only), 12-string rhythm guitar, 6-string electric bass guitar
 Dennis Wilson – backing and harmony vocals, drums

Additional musicians and production staff
 Chuck Britz – engineer
 Ron Swallow – tambourine

References

Doo-wop songs
The Ronettes songs
The Beach Boys songs
1958 songs
Song recordings produced by Brian Wilson